The Lone Rider in Texas Justice is a 1942 American Western film directed by Sam Newfield and written by Steve Braxton. The film stars George Houston as the "Lone Rider", Al St. John as his sidekick "Fuzzy" Jones and Dennis Moore as Sheriff Smoky Moore, with Hillary Brooke, Karl Hackett, Lee Powell and Forrest Taylor. The film was released on June 12, 1942, by Producers Releasing Corporation.

This is the ninth movie in the "Lone Rider" series, which spans seventeen films—eleven starring George Houston, and a further six starring Robert Livingston.

Houston, once an opera singer, sang three songs in this film: "Ride, Cowboy, Ride", "There's Only One Rose in Texas" and "We Will Meet in the Valley". The songs were written by Johnny Lange and Lew Porter.

The movie was not distributed internationally, because it showed thieves dressing up as priests, which was deemed "sacrilegious to many foreign audiences."

Plot
Having served prison time for a cattle rustling that he didn't commit, rancher Jack Stewart is set upon by a gang of vigilantes who want to hang him. Sheriff Smoky Moore is attacked while trying to protect Jack. Tom Cameron, the Lone Rider, and his sidekick Fuzzy Jones stop the hanging and chase the mob away. The real cattle rustler is Nora Mason, who wants Jack to be blamed for her crimes. She frames Jack again, and he's killed by a rancher whose cattle has been stolen. Tom has to unmask the real outlaw gang before they claim more innocent lives.

Cast          
 George Houston as Tom Cameron, the Lone Rider
 Al St. John as Fuzzy Jones
 Dennis Moore as Sheriff Smoky Moore
 Wanda McKay as Kate Stewart
 Claire Rochelle as Nora Mason
 Archie Hall as Trimmer Davis
 Slim Whitaker as Huxley
 Edward Peil Sr. as Hanagan
 Karl Hackett as Jack Stewart
 Julian Rivero as Padre José

See also
The "Lone Rider" films starring George Houston:
 The Lone Rider Rides On (1941)
 The Lone Rider Crosses the Rio (1941)
 The Lone Rider in Ghost Town (1941)
 The Lone Rider in Frontier Fury (1941)
 The Lone Rider Ambushed (1941)
 The Lone Rider Fights Back (1941)
 The Lone Rider and the Bandit (1942)
 The Lone Rider in Cheyenne (1942)
 The Lone Rider in Texas Justice (1942)
 Border Roundup (1942)
 Outlaws of Boulder Pass (1942)
starring Robert Livingston: 
 Overland Stagecoach (1942)
 Wild Horse Rustlers (1943)
 Death Rides the Plains (1943)
 Wolves of the Range (1943)
 Law of the Saddle (1943)
 Raiders of Red Gap (1943)

References

External links
 

1941 films
American Western (genre) films
1941 Western (genre) films
Producers Releasing Corporation films
Films directed by Sam Newfield
1940s English-language films
1940s American films